Beautiful Friction is the tenth studio album by British New Wave band the Fixx, released on 17 July 2012. It marks the return of longtime bassist Dan K. Brown.

Track listing
All songs written by Cy Curnin, Adam Woods, Jamie West-Oram, Rupert Greenall, and Dan K. Brown.
 "Anyone Else" – 3:50
 "Just Before Dawn" – 4:36
 "Take a Risk" – 3:47
 "Beautiful Friction" – 5:43
 "What God?" – 4:14
 "Second Time Around" – 4:16
 "Follow That Cab" – 3:20
 "Shaman" – 4:16
 "Something Ahead of You" – 6:16
 "Girl with No Ceiling" – 4:03
 "Small Thoughts" – 4:35
 "Wasted" (iTunes Bonus Track) – 3:41

Personnel
The Fixx
Cy Curnin – lead vocals
Rupert Greenall – keyboards
Jamie West-Oram – guitar
Adam Woods – drums
Dan K. Brown – bass

Production
Producer: Nick Jackson
Mixing: Stephen W. Tayler
Mixing on "Anyone Else" and "Just Before Dawn": Mark Needham
Mastering: Dave McNair
Cover Artwork: George Underwood
Additional artwork: Jack West-Oram
Photography: Michele Martinoli
Art Direction: Tommy Moore

References

2012 albums
The Fixx albums